The Kinderboekenmuseum (Children's Book Museum) is a museum in The Hague, Netherlands, dedicated to Dutch language children's books. It opened in 1994.

References

External links

 Official website

Museums in The Hague